"Hold Me" is a ballad duet performed by American singers Teddy Pendergrass and Whitney Houston. The song was originally recorded solo by Diana Ross for her 1982 album Silk Electric under the title "In Your Arms", with slightly different lyrics. The version by Pendergrass and Houston appears on Pendergrass's eighth studio album Love Language (1984) and Houston's self-titled debut studio album (1985). It was written by Linda Creed and Michael Masser, with production overseen by Masser. "Hold Me" was the first single release of Houston's career.

In the US, the song became a top five hit on the R&B singles chart and peaked at number 46 on the US Billboard Hot 100 in 1984. It was a top thirty hit in Ireland, the Netherlands, and the Flemish region of Belgium. Ron Wynn of AllMusic highlighted this song on Love Language and he called it a good duet. With this song being distributed in 1984, Houston was ineligible for the nomination of Grammy Award for Best New Artist at the 27th Grammy Awards in 1985, when her own album was released.

Track listing

Personnel
Vocals: Teddy Pendergrass & Whitney Houston
Drums: Carlos Vega
Bass: Nathan East
Keyboards: Randy Kerber, Michael Masser, Ray Parker Jr.
Guitars: Paul Jackson

Charts

Weekly charts

Year-end charts

References

1982 songs
1984 singles
Teddy Pendergrass songs
Whitney Houston songs
Asylum Records singles
1984 debut singles
Contemporary R&B ballads
Male–female vocal duets
Songs written by Michael Masser
Songs written by Linda Creed
Soul ballads
1980s ballads